Yishan (Manchu:  I Šan; 13 June 1790 – 30 June 1878), courtesy name Jingxuan, was a Manchu lesser noble and official of the Qing dynasty. He is best known for his failure to defend Guangzhou (Canton) from British forces during the First Opium War, and for signing the treaties of Kulja and Aigun with the Russian Empire in 1851 and 1858 respectively.

Life
Yishan was born in the Aisin Gioro clan, the imperial clan of the Manchu-led Qing dynasty, towards the end of the reign of the Qianlong Emperor. He was a great-great-grandson of Yunti, the Kangxi Emperor's 14th son and the first in line in the Prince Xun peerage. His great-grandfather, Hongchun (弘春; 1703–1739), once held the title of a junwang (second-rank prince) as "Prince Tai of the Second Rank" (多羅泰郡王). His family was under the Bordered Blue Banner of the Eight Banners.

In 1821, after the Daoguang Emperor came to the throne, Yishan, then a fourth-grade noble was recruited to serve as a third-class imperial guard (三等侍衛) in the Forbidden City. Between 1821 and 1838, he held the following appointments, among others:  (領隊大臣) of Da'erbahatai (塔爾巴哈台; an administrative region in present-day Xinjiang); deputy dutong (都統; commander) of the Bordered Blue Banner Han Forces;  (參贊大臣) of Ili (伊犁; an area within Xinjiang). In 1838, he was appointed as General of Ili to govern and maintain security in the area known as Dzungaria. He was recalled back to the capital, Beijing, two years later.

In 1841, when the First Opium War broke out, the Daoguang Emperor dismissed Qishan from his position as Imperial Commissioner overseeing military affairs in Guangdong Province, and appointed Yishan as "Jingni General" (靖逆將軍) to replace Qishan. Yishan distrusted the local people in Guangdong Province and strengthened defences against them instead of against the British. He recruited inexperienced fresh recruits from Fujian Province to serve in the Qing military instead of seasoned soldiers. Besides, he also spent his time partying with the officers. On 21 May 1841, Yishan ordered his troops to launch a sneak attack on the British at night, but the attack failed. The British captured all the artillery positions outside Guangzhou (Canton). The Qing forces retreated into the city and did not dare to engage the British. Chaos broke out in Guangzhou when the volunteer militias from Nanhai and Hunan started fighting over supplies. On 26 May, Yishan surrendered to the British and signed the Treaty of Guangzhou with Charles Elliot. During his time in Canton Yishan repeatedly sent lies and misinformation to the Daoguang emperor, making it seem that the Qing forces were stronger than the British.

In late 1842, Yishan was detained by the Imperial Clan Court to await trial for his failure to defend Guangzhou. However, he was released in mid-1843 and promoted to second class imperial guard (二等侍衛) and acting banshi dachen (辦事大臣) of Khotan (an area within Xinjiang). In 1845, he was appointed to serve as General of Ili for a second term. In 1847, he was awarded the rank of a first class zhenguo jiangjun, the fourth-lowest tier in the Qing dynasty's hierarchy of noble ranks.

In mid-1851, Ivan Zakharov started negotiations with Yishan and Buyantai (布彥泰) at Ili to open up Kulja and Chuguchak to Sino–Russian trade. The Russians wanted the new treaty to be based on the earlier Treaty of Kyakhta (1727). Yishan agreed to almost all the Russian terms, except for trade in Kashgar. On 6 August 1851, the Russian and Qing Empires signed the Treaty of Kulja. In 1855, Yishan was reassigned to serve as General of Heilongjiang (黑龍江將軍) to oversee Heilongjiang Province.

During the Second Opium War (1857–1860), Nikolay Muravyov-Amursky approached Yishan and offered to provide Russian assistance to the Qing Empire against the British and French, in return for redefining the Sino–Russian border along the Amur and Ussuri rivers. The Russians also put up a display of their military power by firing artillery shells along the Amur River. Yishan was terrified but did not want to retaliate for fear of starting another war. In May 1858, the Russian and Qing Empires signed the Treaty of Aigun, which transferred the lands between the Stanovoy Range and Amur River to the Russian Empire. In 1860, the Russians intervened in the Convention of Beijing (which ended the Second Opium War), and forced the Qing Empire to further cede its territories east of the Ussuri River, including Sakhalin, to them. The Xianfeng Emperor was enraged by the territorial losses to the Russians, so he dismissed Yishan from his office as General of Heilongjiang, despite the latter's attempts to explain himself. Yishan returned to Beijing to await further orders but was soon back into service.

Yishan died of illness in Beijing in 1878. He was survived by at least two sons, including his second son Zaizhuo (載鷟).

See also
 Yunti, Prince Xun
 Prince Xun (恂)
 Royal and noble ranks of the Qing dynasty

References

 
 

Qing dynasty generals
Qing dynasty politicians
Qing dynasty diplomats
Manchu politicians
Imperial Clan of Qing dynasty
Aisin Gioro
1878 deaths
1790 births
Manchu Bordered Blue Bannermen
People of the First Opium War
Military personnel of the Second Opium War
Prince Tai
Prince Xun (恂)